R504 road may refer to:
 R504 road (Ireland)
 R504 road (South Africa)
 R504 Kolyma Highway